Central Luzon State University (CLSU) is a state university on a 658-hectare campus in Muñoz, Nueva Ecija, Philippines. It is the lead agency of the Muñoz Science Community and the seat of the Regional Research and Development Center in Central Luzon. To date, CLSU is one of the premiere institutions for agriculture in the Philippines and in Southeast Asia known for its research in aquaculture, ruminants, crops, orchard, and water management. It has also been placed between the sixth and the twenty-first spot for the most academically-excellent university in the country for various years, surpassing most schools in Metro Manila. It has been placed in the 100 most significant schools in Asia multiple times as well.

CLSU is the first comprehensive state university to undergo institutional accreditation. It is a declared Cultural Property of the Philippines with the code of PH-03-0027 due to its high historical, cultural, academical, and agricultural importance to the nation. It is one of the four prominent universities in Nueva Ecija and the most academically-excellent in all of Central Luzon. It is also listed as one of the most beautiful school campuses in the Philippines due to its expansive and rural-inspired forest and rice field landscapes and architectures, which focus on sustainability and ecological balance with rural and modern architectures.

History
Central Luzon State University is in the Science City of Muñoz, Nueva Ecija, Philippines. It started as a farm school and in 1907 became Central Luzon Agricultural School (CLAS) with the intention of promoting agriculture and mechanics arts. Later, it included the promotion of homemaking arts among its commitments.

In 1954, CLAS was converted into Central Luzon Agricultural College (CLAC) with the mission of promoting agricultural education. In 1964, it was elevated to a university—the Central Luzon State University—to provide advance instruction and technical and professional training in agriculture and mechanics arts, and promote research, literature, philosophy, sciences, technology and arts. Over the years, CLSU has been known as an agriculture-oriented institution.

1989 protests
In 1989, groups of students and teachers protested the dismissal of 17 staff members and the delayed corruption cases against CLSU President Eliseo L. Ruiz at the Sandiganbayan, calling for Ruiz's dismissal, with some of the teachers committing to a hunger strike that lasted at least 40 days.

Contemporary period

In April 2007, CLSU celebrated its centenary.

Today, it has transformed into a comprehensive university offering undergraduate and graduate courses. Lately, it has been designated as a zonal university in Luzon as one of the more respected institutions of higher learning in the Philippines.

The university is the lead agency of the Muñoz Science Community and the seat of the Regional Research and Development Center in the Central Luzon. To date, CLSU is one of the premier institutions of agriculture in Southeast Asia known for its breakthrough research in aquatic culture (especially of tilapia), ruminant, crops, orchard, and water management research.

Campus
It has a more than  site for ranch-type buffalo production and forestry development up the hills of Carranglan town, in northern Nueva Ecija,  from the main campus.

The Main Gate

Showing a farmer with his carabao and plow. School officials and students readily consider CLSU the biggest landmark in Muñoz. In the early 1900s, CLSU made a name by pioneering scientific farming, adopting the half-day academic work and half-day practicum, and promoting citizenship training.

Up to the time it became a university in 1964, the student government ran the affairs of what was then known as "Little Republic." Its governance was patterned after the setup of the national government and the yearly elections were a much anticipated event.

The Reimer's Hall
Built during the time of superintendent William Wade Head (1935–1936), was designed to show talking films, then a first in the province.

Made of wood, steel frame and concrete, with a galvanized iron roof, the building was later fitted with acoustics for cinema functions and bowling alleys. It was named Concordia Hall during the time of superintendent Christian Reimer and later renamed Reimer's Hall.

Equipped with a big stage, the 500-seat hall had been used to stage plays produced by students. In 1939, the school's first Filipino superintendent, Emeterio Asinas, improved the structure so it can hold functions and social affairs.
The most significant affair held there was the inauguration of CLAC on January 6, 1952. Then President Elpidio Quirino and his defense secretary, Ramon Magsaysay, graced the event. Among the other prominent guests were senators, congressmen, Cabinet members, diplomats, school officials and representatives of the country's top universities and colleges.

Magsaysay would have returned to Reimer's Hall on April 5, 1955, as Philippine president during the golden jubilee and graduation programs, but he died in a plane crash on March 17, 1955. He would have been conferred the honorary degree of doctor of agricultural education, CLAC continued with the program. Two empty chairs, draped in black, and a speaker's stand decorated with academic regalia, diploma and citations for Magsaysay were set up on the stage to remember the late president.

A modern auditorium was later built beside Reimer's Hall during the time of then CLSU president Amado Campos, who changed the complexion of the campus with his more than P45-million infrastructure build-up during his term from 1972 to 1986.

Brief history 

Central Luzon State University (CLSU) is one of the renowned and prestigious institutions of higher learning in the Philippines. It has consistently produced well-trained professionals and technicians, provided services with marked excellence.

CLAS: On April 12, 1907, it started as a farm school, the Central Luzon Agricultural School (CLAS), through Executive Order No. 10 issued by then Governor General James F. Smith, James F. Smith.  Its initial emphasis was on the development of skilled and technician-type graduates to meet the human resource requirements in the opening and cultivation of rich farmlands.

As a school, CLAS stamped a class of its own. With its unique curriculum, it promoted agriculture and mechanic arts which combined practicum and academic work. In time, CLAS became known as the "mother of vocational agriculture schools" in the country.

CLAC: The school was converted into Central Luzon Agricultural College (CLAC) on December 31, 1950, by virtue of Executive Order No. 393 issued by then President Elpidio Quirino to promote agricultural education.  As a higher learning institution, CLAC distinguished itself as the first state college established by the Philippine government to promote agricultural education, agricultural engineering and home economics, among others.

CLSU: On June 18, 1964, CLAC was elevated into Central Luzon State University (CLSU) by virtue of Republic Act No. 4067 "to give professional and technical training in agriculture and mechanic arts; provide advance instruction; promote research, literature, philosophy, the sciences, technology and arts."

From its basically agricultural orientation, CLSU turned into a comprehensive higher education institution offering various undergraduate and graduate courses.

On October 19, 2001, CLSU was launched as the Model Agri-Tourism Site for Luzon under the Philippine Agri-Tourism Program, a joint project of the Department of Agriculture and Department of Tourism.

Administration and organization

Administrative Council

Board of Regents

Past presidents

Central Luzon Agricultural School (CLAS) 1907–1954

Central Luzon Agricultural College (CLAC) 1954–1964

Central Luzon State University (CLSU)

Research
The Research Program primarily started in 1976 to help graduate students in their agricultural researches. Having momentum and acknowledging the importance of research in an academic community, its thrust expanded to cover several technical researches on selected agricultural commodities. In 1978, the Research and Extension Programs were merged which gave birth to the Research and Development Center (R & DC). The R & DC adopted the pipeline approach as its strategy to spur countryside group for information and technology dissemination and contribute to the realization of the university's development goals. It relives the maxim "development is research utilized". Research was, therefore, envisioned to establish a foundation that would accomplish one of the trilogies of functions of the university.

Moving on with this commitment, the R & DC became the Research, Extension and Training (RET) in 1987 where prioritized research programs are important features and are geared towards improving the quality of life of the people it serves.

Today, the Research Office has received prominence and has established a solid ground in its continuous and relentless efforts towards contributing to countryside development.

Ranking

The 2010 survey ranked the Central Luzon State University as sixth of the nine Top Universities for the following: Center of Excellence (COE) in Agriculture, Agricultural Engineering, Fisheries, Veterinary Medicine, Teacher Education; and as Centers of Development (COD) in Biology and Chemistry.

In 2014 the university's ranked dropped to seventh for the following Center of Excellence (COE): agricultural engineering, agriculture, biology, fisheries, teacher education, veterinary medicine and in Centers of Development (COD): chemistry.

In 2015, the World Ranking Web of Universities released the list of top 100 colleges and universities from which Central Luzon State University was ranked at 39th.

In June 2015, the Nationwide Ranking of Universities based on board passers Central Luzon State University ranked 21st.

As of December 2020, CLSU is among the top 14 universities in the Philippines that is listed in Asia's Higher Education Institutions (HEIs) by Quacquarelli Symonds.

Institutes and centers
University Graduate Program Office
Information System Institute
Institute of Sports, Physical Education and Recreation
Institute for Climate Change and Environmental Management
Center for Educational Resources and Development Services
Center for Central Luzon Studies
Expanded Tertiary Education Equivalency and Accreditation Program
CLSU Open University

Academics
CLSU is composed of:
 College of Agriculture
 College of Arts and Social Sciences
 College of Business Administration and Accountancy
 College of Education
 College of Engineering
 College of Fisheries
 College of Home Science and Industry
 College of Science
 College of Veterinary Science and Medicine

In addition, it houses a University Science High School and an Institute of Graduate Studies.

Accredited programs 
Programs accredited by the Accrediting Agency of Chartered Colleges and Universities in the Philippines

Source: Accrediting Agency of Chartered Colleges and Universities in the Philippines AACCUP

University partnerships
Central Luzon State University, Wesleyan University – Philippines, Nueva Ecija University of Science and Technology, and PHINMA-Araullo University, are "dubbed" as Eagle Universities in Nueva Ecija. The four universities are the main educational institution in the province, of which, all have different specializations. CLSU specializes on agriculture, aquaculture, business administration and accountancy, veterinary medicine, biology, chemistry, and engineering.

New institutions in the making
The university is currently moving in favor of the possible establishment of a separate School of Fine Arts and Architecture and a separate School of Literary Arts and Linguistics. The Central Luzon region lacks enough artists, architects, and literary writers coming from its eastern provinces. The lack is intended to be fulfilled through the establishment of such schools within Central Luzon State University, a fitting home as the university is the most acclaimed in the region. The establishment of such schools is a precursor to the future establishment of the first art gallery in the university.

Student activism
During the 1950s, the university had a very active activism culture which focused on land reform and the rights of farmers. Student activism again peaked in the university during the People Power Revolution which overthrew the Marcos dictatorship in Manila. The protest was a symbolism from the university's students to abolish martial rule and remove Marcos from the presidency. With the advent of democracy, activism waned and eventually was downgraded by the 1990s. There are currently no activism culture in the university. However, some student organizations have proposed its return to the campus culture to promote student participation in national-level activism, as extrajudicial killings have risen and a threat from a new age martial rule has been repeatedly announced through presidential speeches. In 2017, the university student body failed to participate in the nationwide Day of Protest against extrajudicial killings which has surpassed 11,000 deaths, government's threat to declare martial rule, and the declaration of heroic statements for Marcos by Philippine President Duterte. The organization vowed to initiate the rally annually to mobilize student participation and positive activism.

References

External links

Inquirer.net, Carabao may be key to biofuel, says scientist
www.clsu.edu.ph official website
Official site of CLSU Alumni
Official site of CLSU Collegian
www.clsu-collegian.webs.com site

State universities and colleges in the Philippines
Universities and colleges in Nueva Ecija
Education in Muñoz, Nueva Ecija
Philippine Association of State Universities and Colleges